Darrell Foss (born Darrell Burton Foss; March 24, 1892 – September 15, 1962) was a film actor. He had a leading role in films including in The Loyalty of Taro San, a Triangle Film Corporation production, and opposite May Allison in at least two films, The Walk-Offs and Held in Trust. He taught a character played by Gloria Swanson to play the banjo in one film.

Biography
Darrell Foss was born 28 March 1892 in Oconomowoc, Wisconsin, USA as Darrell Burton Foss. He died 15 September 1962 in Los Angeles, California at the age of 70.

Filmography
An Even Break (1917)
Polly Ann (1917)
The Firefly of Tough Luck (1917)
The Regenerates (197)
The Testing of Mildred Vane (1918)
You Can't Believe Everything (1918)
The Return of Mary (1918)
Her Decision (1918)
Her American Husband (1918)
The Loyalty of Taro San (1918)
The Man Who Woke Up (1918)
A Soul Trust (1918)
The Red Lantern (1919)
The Parisian Tigress (1919)
Loot (1919)
The Brat (1919)
The Walk-Offs (1920)
Held In Trust (1920)
From the Ground Up (film) (1921)
An Unwilling Hero (1921)
 Don't Neglect Your Wife (1921)
Luring Lips (1921), Foss played opposite Edith Roberts as a married couple
The Woman He Married (1922)
A Homespun Vamp (1922)

References

External links

1892 births
1962 deaths
American male film actors
20th-century American male actors
Date of death missing